The 2024 Richmond mayoral election will take place on November 5, 2024, to elect the mayor of Richmond, Virginia. Incumbent Democratic mayor Levar Stoney is term-limited and cannot seek re-election to a third term in office.

Candidates

Filed paperwork
Michelle Mosby, former president of the Richmond City Council and candidate for mayor in 2016 (Party affiliation: Independent)
Garrett Sawyer (Party affiliation: Democratic)

Potential
Jeff Bourne, state delegate (Party affiliation: Democratic)

References

Richmond
Richmond
Mayoral elections in Richmond, Virginia